"As Good as New" is a song recorded in 1979 by Swedish group ABBA, and was used as the opening track on their Voulez-Vous album. The lead vocals are by Agnetha Fältskog. The song was released as a single in Mexico as a double A-side with "I Have a Dream", where it became ABBA's ninth (and final) number-one hit. "As Good as New" was also released in Argentina and in Bolivia.

History
As usual, the song was written and composed by Andersson and Ulvaeus. It originally had the working title "It's Better Now".

References

External links
Vinyl Singles at ABBA for the Record

1979 singles
1979 songs
ABBA songs
Polar Music singles
Songs written by Benny Andersson and Björn Ulvaeus